The  is a small right Japanese patriot party. The ideas they promote include using the armed forces to defend Japan and the promotion of the Japanese emperor as someone that is higher than any other authority.

However it also invited to one of their discussions Kimura Mitsuhiro of another extreme right group Issuikai (一水会). Kimura made friends with politicians like Jean Marie Le Pen. One of Jean Marie Le Pen's rallies in France was discussed in one of Restoration Political Party New Wind's magazines.

Logos

Councillors election results

References

External links
 Restoration Political Party・New Wind - official web site

1995 establishments in Japan
Monarchist parties in Japan
Nationalist parties in Japan
Political parties established in 1995
Political parties in Japan
Right-wing populist parties
Far-right politics in Japan